Michael Berger (born 1 December 1990) is an Austrian footballer who plays for SV Allerheiligen.

References

Austrian footballers
Austrian Football Bundesliga players
1990 births
Living people
Grazer AK players
SC Wiener Neustadt players
Wolfsberger AC players
Floridsdorfer AC players

Association football defenders